D-Photo is a bi-monthly full colour, perfect bound photography magazine (and associated website) that focuses on digital photography, cameras and related products in New Zealand. D-Photo is produced by Parkside Media and caters to novice, amateur, and enthusiast photographers.

Magazine contents
As of the December/January 2009 issue (#27), the typical magazine contents included:
Editor and contributor columns
Newly released products and imaging events
Product and software reviews
Readers’ letters
Articles outlining tips, tricks and techniques (such as image editing, lighting techniques, etc.)
Interviews with prominent professional photographers
Photo competitions

Website
Daily news articles are available weekdays which are additional to magazine content. Full magazine articles and competition results are available from previous issues, often including additional photos and information (including videos) that could not be fitted into the magazine.

A forum is run as a subsite to encourage user interaction. Users can purchase books related to photography, as well as back issues and subscriptions in the online shop.

Editorial staff
Editor Adrian Hatwell has been with the magazine since 2010. Notable contributors include Fraser Kitt, Wayne Lorimer, Hans Weichselbaum, David Maida, Jackie Ranken, Mike Langford and Harley Ogier.

Support of events in New Zealand
Parkside Media provides some support to the PSNZ (Photographic Society of New Zealand) and is a media partner for the NZIPP (New Zealand Institute of Professional Photography) Annual Iris Photography Awards.

See also
The Photographer's Mail – defunct photography industry magazine also published by Parkside Media
Tone  – defunct consumer technology magazine also published by Parkside Media

References

External links
D-Photo
Parkside Media

1999 establishments in New Zealand
Bi-monthly magazines
Magazines established in 1999
Magazines published in New Zealand
Photography magazines
Photography in New Zealand